Diamond is a given name derived from the name of the diamond gemstone. The word is derived from the Greek adamas. The name was among the 1,000 most popular names for newborn girls in the United States between 1986 and 2014 and remains in regular use. Deimantė, a Lithuanian variant, was the 10th most popular name for baby girls born in Lithuania in 2007.

Usage of the name was occasionally inspired by the Diamond Jubilee of Queen Victoria in 1897. Other jewel names such as Ruby, Pearl, and Opal also first came into wider use in the Anglosphere during the Victorian Era along with other names from the natural world.

The boy hero of the 1871 children's book At the Back of the North Wind by George MacDonald is named Diamond.

People
 Diamond DeShields (born 1995), American basketball player
 Diamond Donner, American actress
 Diamond Stone (born 1997), American male basketball player
 Diamond White (born 1999), American singer-songwriter and actress
 Zhang Bichen (born 1989), or called Diamond Zhang, Chinese singer-songwriter
 Diamond Jenness (1886-1969), New Zealand born Canadian (male) anthropologist
 Diamond and Silk

Related names
Diamanda (English)
Deimantė (Lithuanian)
Diamante (Latin)
Diamante (Italian language)

See also
Damond, given name and surname
Diamond (surname), the surname.

Notes

English feminine given names
Feminine given names
English given names
Given names derived from gemstones